Kawekamo, also known as Kamwekamo, is an Administrative Ward and the headquarter of the Ilemela District in Mwanza Region Tanzania. In 2016 the Tanzania National Bureau of Statistics report there were 22,526 people in the ward.

Villages 
The ward has 7 villages.

 Nyasaka A
 Nyasaka B
 Nyasaka C
 Msumbiji
 Kawekamo B
 Pasiansi Mashariki A
 Pasiansi Mashariki B

References

Wards of Mwanza Region
Ilemela District
Constituencies of Tanzania